Democratic Forward Bloc is a political party in Tamil Nadu, India. It was formed as a break-away faction of the Tamil Nadu Forward Bloc. DFB was formed in 1983. Initially it was led by P.K. Muthuramalingam.

Today the general secretary of the party is S. Velusamy. In the 2001 state Legislative Assembly elections in Tamil Nadu, DFB had launched five candidates, who together got 3 270 votes.

References

Political parties in Tamil Nadu
1983 establishments in Tamil Nadu
Political parties established in 1983
All India Forward Bloc